Jeremiah Anthony Green (born May 8, 1990) is an American professional football outside linebacker who is a free agent. He played college football at the University of Nevada. He is the brother of Los Angeles Chargers tight end Virgil Green.

Professional career

Jacksonville Jaguars
On April 27, 2013, he signed with the Jacksonville Jaguars as an undrafted free agent following the 2013 NFL Draft. He was released on August 25.

San Jose SaberCats
Green was assigned to the San Jose SaberCats of the Arena Football League on October 8, 2013. The SaberCats reassigned Green on November 6, 2013.

Ottawa Redblacks
Green signed a contract with the Ottawa Redblacks of the Canadian Football League on April 3, 2014. He was released by the Redblacks on September 6, 2014.

References

External links
Nevada bio
Jacksonville Jaguars bio

1990 births
Living people
People from Tulare, California
Players of American football from California
American football linebackers
Nevada Wolf Pack football players
Jacksonville Jaguars players
San Jose SaberCats players
Sportspeople from Tulare County, California
Ottawa Redblacks players